Jefferson is a borough in Greene County, Pennsylvania, United States. The population was 253 at the 2020 census, a decline from the figure of 270 tabulated in 2010. The borough was named after Thomas Jefferson.

Geography
Jefferson is located in northeastern Greene County at  (39.930322, -80.058993). It is surrounded by Jefferson Township, a separate municipality. Pennsylvania Route 188 (Jefferson Road) passes through the center of the borough, leading east  to Dry Tavern and west  to Waynesburg, the county seat.

The South Fork of Tenmile Creek passes just north of the borough.

Demographics

As of the census of 2000, there were 337 people, 139 households, and 97 families residing in the borough. The population density was 1,801.8 people per square mile (684.8/km²). There were 147 housing units at an average density of 786.0/sq mi (298.7/km²). The racial makeup of the borough was 99.41% White, 0.30% African American, and 0.30% from two or more races.

There were 139 households, out of which 30.2% had children under the age of 18 living with them, 52.5% were married couples living together, 11.5% had a female householder with no husband present, and 30.2% were non-families. 25.9% of all households were made up of individuals, and 14.4% had someone living alone who was 65 years of age or older. The average household size was 2.42 and the average family size was 2.91.

In the borough the population was spread out, with 25.2% under the age of 18, 4.7% from 18 to 24, 26.7% from 25 to 44, 22.8% from 45 to 64, and 20.5% who were 65 years of age or older. The median age was 41 years. For every 100 females there were 93.7 males. For every 100 females age 18 and over, there were 89.5 males.

The median income for a household in the borough was $33,750, and the median income for a family was $40,893. Males had a median income of $28,958 versus $14,219 for females. The per capita income for the borough was $15,294. About 8.9% of families and 7.8% of the population were below the poverty line, including 3.8% of those under age 18 and 16.7% of those age 65 or over.

References

Populated places established in 1795
Boroughs in Greene County, Pennsylvania